Croatia was represented by 12 athletes (7 men and 5 women) at the 2010 European Athletics Championships held in Barcelona, Spain, from 27 July to 1 August 2010.

Participants

Men

Track and field events

Field events

Women

Track and road events

Field events

Results

References 
Participants list

Nations at the 2010 European Athletics Championships
2010
European Athletics Championships